Čadca (until 1918 Čatca, Czača) is a district town in northern Slovakia, near the border with Poland and the Czech Republic.

Etymology
The name is derived from a word čad (smoke, soot; Proto-Slavic: čadъ, Slovak/Czech: čad, Polish: czad ). The form Čadca is a toponymic appellative. The name was probably motivated by the burning glades.

Geography
It is located south of the Jablunkov Pass, surrounded by the Javorníky, Kysucké Beskydy and Turzovská vrchovina mountain ranges. A Goral minority lives in the surroundings.

History
The town was established in the 17th century; the first written reference dates back to 1565 as Tzaczcka. The town charter was granted in 1778.

Demographics
According to the 2010 census, the town had 24,959 inhabitants with 2.2% Czech and 0.4% Roma. The religious make-up was 82.97% Roman Catholics  and 0.36% Lutherans; most of others stated no religious affiliation.

Industry
One of the world's largest (and last) producers of vacuum tubes, JJ Electronic has a factory in Čadca.

Transport
Čadca railway station is the town's main station. It forms part of the cross-border Žilina–Čadca–Svrčinovec zastávka–Mosty u Jablunkova railway (to the Czech Republic), and is also a junction station for two other lines, one of them also cross-border (to Poland).

The station offers services to several destinations in the two cross-border countries. For the Czech Republic, there are many trains to Ostrava, Bohumin or Prague, operated by trains of the České dráhy and LEO Express companies, and to Poland, there are trains towards Zwardoń.

Notable people
Ľubomír Michalík, footballer (1983-)

Twin towns — sister cities

Čadca is twinned with:
 Valašské Meziříčí, Czech Republic
 Toruń, Poland
 Żywiec, Poland

See also
 List of municipalities and towns in Slovakia

References

Genealogical resources

The records for genealogical research are available at the state archive "Statny Archiv in Bytca, Slovakia"

 Roman Catholic church records (births/marriages/deaths): 1742-1902 (parish A)

External links 
 Town website
Surnames of living people in Cadca

Villages and municipalities in Čadca District
Cities and towns in Slovakia